John James Dudley Stuart Townshend, 6th Marquess Townshend   (17 October 1866 – 17 November 1921), known as Viscount Raynham from 1866 to 1899, was a British peer.

Early life
Townshend was the son of John Villiers Stuart Townshend, 5th Marquess Townshend, and Lady Anne Elizabeth Clementina Duff. His paternal grandfather was John Townshend, 4th Marquess Townshend and his maternal grandfather was James Duff, 5th Earl Fife.  His father was a Member of Parliament for Tamworth before his elevation to the House of Lords in 1863.

Career and peerage
Upon the death of his father in 1899, he succeeded as the 11th Baronet Townshend of Rainham, the 9th Baron Townshend of Lynn Regis, the 6th Marquess Townshend of Raynham, and the 9th Viscount Townshend of Raynham.

Lord Townshend served as the Deputy Lieutenant of Norfolk.

Personal life

Heavily in debt, Townshend was forced to sell many of the family's valuables, including nearly 200 masterpieces, including works by Thomas Gainsborough, Peter Paul Rubens, and Anthony van Dyck. He leased the family estate Raynham Hall, before traveling to America to find a rich wife.  Lord Townshend became engaged to a Mrs. Evelyn Sheffield of Jacksonville, Florida, but broke off the engagement "when he discovered she was not as rich as she had implied." After he returned to England, he was introduced to Thomas Sutherst, a barrister who agreed to pay off his debts if he married his daughter.  Lord Townshend isagreed and on 9 August 1905, he married Gwladys Ethel Gwendolen Eugénie 
Sutherst.

Shortly after the wedding, his new father-in-law attempted to have Lord Townshend declared insane, however, "a court found him incapable of managing his own financial affairs, but sane enough to remain at liberty, under the care of his wife." Despite her father's manipulations, reportedly the Marchioness was genuinely devoted to Townshend and worked diligently to restore the family fortunes so her children could be raised at Raynham Hall, although some of the family's land holdings elsewhere were sold. Before his death in 1921, they were the parents of:

 George John Patrick Dominic Townshend, 7th Marquess Townshend (1916–2010), who married three times and served as chairman of Anglia Television from 1958 to 1986.
 Lady Elizabeth Mary Gladys Townshend (1917–1950), who married Sir Eric White, 2nd Baronet. She later married John Clifford Roberts.

Lord Townshend died in November 1921, aged 55, and was succeeded in his titles by his five-year-old son George. Lady Townshend later married Bernard le Strange and died in 1959.

Descendants
The current Marquess Towshend, Charles Townshend, 8th Marquess Townshend (born 1945), is his grandson and music producer and sound engineer, Cenzo Townshend (b. 1963), is his great-grandson.

References

1866 births
1921 deaths
19th-century English nobility
20th-century English nobility
Deputy Lieutenants of Norfolk
06
John Townshend